

UN Chinese Language Day is observed annually on April 20.  The event was established by the UN Department of Public Information in 2010, seeking "to celebrate multilingualism and cultural diversity as well as to promote equal use of all six of its official working languages throughout the organization". April 20 was chosen as the date "to pay tribute to Cangjie, a mythical figure who is presumed to have invented Chinese characters about 5,000 years ago".

The first Chinese Language Day was celebrated in 2010 on the 12th of November, but since 2011 the date has been the 20th of April, roughly corresponding to Guyu in the Chinese calendar. Chinese people celebrate Guyu (which usually begins around April 20) in honour of Cangjie, because of a legend that when Cangjie invented Chinese characters, the deities and ghosts cried and it rained millet; the word "Guyu" literally means "rain of millet".

Annual Events

2021
The Events Theme for 2021 is Highlighting Pictographs. In UN Headquarters in New York, a three-event series organized by UNSRC Chinese Book Club focused on three types of pictographs (Liangzhu inscribed symbols, Dongba script and oracle bone script) associated with three cultures and three UNESCO World Heritage Sites (Archaeological Ruins of Liangzhu City, Old Town of Lijiang and Yinxu). The three events were: a guided tour of the Liangzhu Museum, a language class on Dongba script, and a lecture on the origin and evolution of Chinese characters (the oracle bone script, and Liushu, or pictographically-based character building in Chinese). The three events were also placed within three broader contexts: the four great ancient civilizations, multilingualism, and pristine writing systems. The three events were conducted via Zoom from April 19 to 21, 2021. China's Permanent Representative to the United Nations, Ambassador Zhang Jun, delivered a speech at the first event.

See also 
Chinese language
Standard Chinese
 International Mother Language Day
 International observance
 Official languages of the United Nations

References

External links
 Official site (English)
 Official site (Chinese)

April observances
Chinese